1998 AFC U-16 Championship was the 8th edition of the AFC U-16 Championship. Qatar hosted the tournament from 3 to 17 September 1998. The top two teams qualified for the 1999 FIFA U-17 World Championship in New Zealand.

Qualification

The following 10 teams qualified for the final tournament.
Group 1: 
Group 2: 
Group 3: 
Group 4: 
Group 5: 
Group 6:  
Group 7: 
Group 8: 
Group 9: 
Host:

Stadium
All matches were held in Grand Hamad Stadium, Doha, Qatar.

Group stage
Group winners and runners-up advanced to the semi-finals.

All matches were held in Grand Hamad Stadium, Doha, Qatar.

Group A

Group B

Knockout stage

Semifinals

Third place match

Final

Winners

Teams qualified for 1999 FIFA U-17 World Championship

Inter-confederation playoff
Third-placed Bahrain played off against Australia (winners of the 1999 OFC U-17 championship) for the final slot for the 1999 FIFA U-17 World Championship.

Australia won 3–1 on aggregate and qualified for the 1999 FIFA U-17 World Championship.

Sources
rsssf.com

 
Under
International association football competitions hosted by Qatar

1998–99 in Qatari football
1998 in youth association football
AFC U-16 Championships